Scalps is a 1983 American horror film directed by Fred Olen Ray that concerns a vengeful Native American spirit.

Plot
Six college archeology students work on a dig in the California desert, despite the warnings of a professor and an elderly Native American.  When the group digs around in an Indian burial ground for artifacts, they unleash the evil spirit of Black Claw.  The entity possesses one of the group and begins slaughtering them one by one.

Cast
Jo-Ann Robinson as D.J.
Richard Hench as Randy/Black Claw
Roger Maycock as Kershaw Ellerbe
Frank McDonald as Ben Murphy
Carol Sue Flockhart as Louise Landon
Barbara Magnusson as Ellen Corman
Kirk Alyn as Professor Machen
Carroll Borland as Dr. Sharon Reynolds
Cynthia Hartline as Ann
Forrest J Ackerman as Professor Trentwood

Production
Ray says the idea for the film was suggested to him by a friend, Donald G Jackson. "It was meant to be the cheapest film possible," said Ray. "I used to describe it as 6 Kids, a Station Wagon and a Tent and it pretty much was."

Release
The film was re-edited by the distributor. Ray later recalled:
The cut we turned in was the one we wanted. Unfortunately being pretty green about that end of the business we also gave them, the distributor, the trims and outs and the result was their "improved" version. The Lion head was only meant to be seen for one or two seconds, but we shot a lot of it in order to have footage to choose from. It was a big mistake giving 21st Century the leftovers, but I don't think anyone would have guessed what was going to happen with it. They also cut in some shots of the killer Indian before he actually appeared in the story. It was maddening.
The film was given a limited release theatrically in the United States by 21st Century Film Corporation beginning in December 1983.

The film was released in the U.S. on a double feature video format by Continental Video alongside another feature - The Slayer.  It was cut by five minutes or so, in order to make room for the second feature, but all the gruesome scenes and violence are intact.

The film was released on DVD by Olen Ray's Retromedia Entertainment in 2004.  This release is currently out of print.

Ray says the film mentioned at the end, Scalps 2: The Return of D.J. was a joke, one he used on Phantom Empire and Hollywood Chainsaw Hookers. "I used to promise sequels where I never intended to do them." He says, though, that a fan once sent him a fan-made sequel.

The film was loosely remade in 2004 as Blood Desert by Stegath Dorr.

References

External links 
 
Review of film at Hysteria Lives

Films directed by Fred Olen Ray
1983 horror films
1983 films
1980s horror thriller films
1983 independent films
1980s mystery films
1980s teen horror films
American teen horror films
1980s English-language films
American supernatural horror films
American slasher films
1980s slasher films
American films about revenge
1980s ghost films
Native American cemeteries in popular culture
Supernatural slasher films
Redsploitation
American ghost films
American splatter films
21st Century Film Corporation films
American exploitation films
1980s American films